Impact, Muang Thong Thani is a commercial complex consisting of an arena, convention centre and exhibition halls, located in Muang Thong Thani in Pak Kret District of Nonthaburi Province, a northern suburb of Bangkok, Thailand.

It has been considered as the second largest exhibition and convention venue in Asia with an indoor floor space of over 140,000 sqm. Its Challenger Hall is currently the world's largest column-free exhibition hall. The venue hosts over 490 events and welcomes over 15 million visitors each year.

History
Impact, Muang Thong Thani originated as the Muang Thong Thani Sports Complex, built for the 1998 Asian Games by real estate developer Bangkok Land. Bangkok Land is the developer of Muang Thong Thani, a real estate development envisioned in 1989 as a satellite city of Bangkok. It grew rapidly among Thailand's economic boom of the early 1990s, but became ruined financially when the bubble burst in the lead-up to the 1997 Asian financial crisis.

Bangkok Land had been selected as a venue for the games before the crisis, and there were concerns whether it would be able to finish the construction on time. It was completed less than a month before the games began in December 1998. The Muang Thong Thani Sports Complex hosted boxing, weightlifting, billiards & snooker, gymnastics, volleyball, tennis and rugby competitions.

Following the conclusion of the games, Bangkok Land redeveloped part of the sports complex as a convention and exhibition center, renaming it the Impact Exhibition Center in 1999. At the time, the entire venue comprised what is now Impact Arena and the first four halls of Impact Exhibition Center. the weightlifting and rugby venues, now Thunder Dome and Thunderdome Stadium, had their ownership contractually transferred to the Sports Authority of Thailand.

The Impact Convention Center was built in 2000, while the expansion of IMPACT Exhibition Center was completed in 2003. The column-free Impact Challenger exhibition halls were completed in early 2006. Spanning 60,000 sqm, the Impact Challenger Halls are presently the world's biggest column-free exhibition halls.

The Miss Universe 2005 and Miss Universe 2018 beauty pageants were held at the Impact Arena. It was originally scheduled to host the Miss Earth 2011 but was relocated back to the Philippines because of the 2011 Thailand floods.

The Impact Arena hosted five ONE Championship mixed martial arts events from 2016 to 2018. It also hosted 2018 Thomas & Uber Cup badminton tournament, which is also the first time Thailand hosted a major badminton event since 1976 Thomas Cup.

Facilities

Entertainment events
IMPACT the busiest entertainment venue in Thailand for many regional and international artists over the years when they perform in Thailand, spanning a wide range of musical genres.

See also
 List of tennis stadiums by capacity

References

External links

Novotel Bangkok Impact
Ibis Bangkok Impact
Impace Sports Club 
Beehive Lifestyle Mall 
Cosmo Office Park
Thunder Dome

Buildings and structures in Nonthaburi province
Convention centers in Thailand
Music venues in Thailand
Indoor arenas in Thailand
Tennis venues in Thailand
Sports venues in Thailand
Bangkok Land
Event venues established in 1998
1998 establishments in Thailand